The Federal Telegraph Company was a United States manufacturing and communications company that played a pivotal role in the 20th century in the development of radio communications.

History

The company was founded in Palo Alto, California in 1909 by Cyril Frank Elwell, and was first known as the Poulsen Wireless Company, after licensing Valdemar Poulsen's arc transmitter for use in the United States. In 1911-13, Lee De Forest and two assistants worked at Federal Telegraph on the first vacuum tube amplifier and oscillator, which De Forest called the "Oscillaton" after his earlier Audion. 

During World War One, the U.S. Navy purchased Federal Telegraph, but after the end of the war a displeased U.S. Congress ordered the Navy to return the company to its original owners. The company merged in August 1927 with the Mackay Companies. Originally a separate entity within the Mackay Companies, when International Telephone and Telegraph (ITT) purchased the Mackay Companies in 1928 Federal remained a component of the Mackay structure as a manufacturing entity.

In 1931, Dr. Ernest O. Lawrence, inventor of the cyclotron, convinced Federal Telegraph to donate an 80-ton magnet they had developed for a canceled project in China to his first cyclotron project on the campus of the University of California Berkeley.  Lawrence's invention of the cyclotron was the basis of his being awarded the Nobel Prize in 1939.

In 1940, Sosthenes Behn moved Federal Telegraph under ITT directly so that its manufacturing capabilities could help ITT replace those in Europe that had been shut down because of the war and the Fall of France.

In 1954, FTR changed its name from Federal Telegraph and Radio Corporation - an IT&T associate to Federal Telegraph and Radio Company - division of IT&T, and its research division became the Federal Telecommunications Laboratories, both continuing as subsidiaries of ITT after World War II through at least the 1950s.

References

Further reading
 Cyril Frank Elwell - Pioneer of American and European Wireless Communications, Talking Pictures and founder of C.F. Elwell Limited 1922-1925 by Ian L. Sanders. Published by Castle Ridge Press, 2013. (Details the founding of Federal Telegraph and Telephone Company in Palo Alto, California by Elwell.)

Radio electronics
History of radio
Telegraph companies of the United States
ITT Inc.
Telecommunications companies established in 1909
American companies established in 1909
Telecommunications companies disestablished in 1927
American companies disestablished in 1927
Radio manufacturers